MyFitnessPal is a  health and fitness tracking smartphone app and website. The app is available for Android and iOS devices.

Overview 
MyFitnessPal is smartphone application which uses gamification elements, for exercise and diet management. The app provides features such as, ability to enter diet data manually, or by scanning bar codes and Meal Scan feature for premium version, a computer vision technology developed by Passio Inc. that allows users to log meals by pointing their phones at ingredients and recipes. MyFitnessPal has access to 14 million foods data, with metrics to track exercise and calories.

MyFitnessPal account with other fitness apps like Garmin Connect, FitBit, Samsung Health, and Apple Watch. In February 2015, Under Armour acquired MyFitnessPal. In 2020, Under Armour sold MyFitnessPal to Francisco Partners, a private equity firm.

The app is free with extra features available purchase.

History
Released in September 2005, MyFitnessPal was developed by Mike Lee, with his brother Albert Lee later joining him to launch the app and the company.

On February 4, 2015, MyFitnessPal was acquired by athletic apparel maker, Under Armour, in a deal worth $475 million. MyFitnessPal had 80 million users at the time.

On May 4, 2015, MyFitnessPal introduced a premium subscription tier for its applications.

In January 2017, founders Albert Lee and Mike Lee departed from the company to pursue other business ventures.

On October 30, 2020, Under Armour announced that MyFitnessPal would be sold to the private equity firm Francisco Partners for $345 million and that it was shutting down Endomondo. In 2021, MyFitnessPal partnered with Sprouts Farmers Market. Through this partnership, users were introduced to new healthy recipe ideas, food and health-related articles and other content.

Security breach
On March 29, 2018, Under Armour disclosed a data breach of 150 million accounts at its subsidiary, MyFitnessPal. The compromised data consisted of usernames, e-mail addresses, and hashed passwords, but not credit card numbers or government identifiers (social security numbers, national identification numbers). Under Armour was notified of the breach the week of 19–25 March and learned that the leak happened sometime in February.

See also
Google Fit
Health (Apple), also known as Apple Health
MSN Health & Fitness
Samsung Health

References

External links

Fitness apps
Health software
Activity trackers
Cross-platform mobile software
Application software
IOS software
WatchOS software
Android (operating system) software
Windows Phone software
2005 software
Gamification
2015 mergers and acquisitions
2020 mergers and acquisitions